The 1981 NCAA Division II Soccer Championship was the tenth annual tournament held by the NCAA to determine the top men's Division II college soccer program in the United States. This was the final Division II tournament to feature a third-place match.

Tampa defeated Cal State Los Angeles in the final, 1–0 (after one overtime period), to win their first Division II national title. The Spartans (14-0-3) were coached by Jay Miller.

The semifinals and final were played at the Soccer-Lacrosse Stadium on the campus of Yale University in New Haven, Connecticut.

Bracket

Final

See also  
 1981 NCAA Division I Soccer Championship
 1981 NCAA Division III Soccer Championship
 1981 NAIA Soccer Championship

References 

NCAA Division II Men's Soccer Championship
NCAA Division II Men's Soccer Championship
NCAA Division II Men's Soccer Championship
NCAA Division II Men's Soccer Championship
Tampa Spartans men's soccer